Belfast North was a borough constituency of the Parliament of Northern Ireland from 1921 to 1929. It returned four MPs, using proportional representation by means of the single transferable vote.

Boundaries
Belfast North was created by the Government of Ireland Act 1920 and contained the Clifton, Duncairn and Shankill wards of the County Borough of Belfast. The House of Commons (Method of Voting and Redistribution of Seats) Act (Northern Ireland) 1929 divided the constituency into four constituencies elected under first past the post: Belfast Clifton, Belfast Duncairn, Belfast Oldpark and Belfast Shankill constituencies.

Second Dáil
In May 1921, Dáil Éireann, the parliament of the self-declared Irish Republic run by Sinn Féin, passed a resolution declaring that elections to the House of Commons of Northern Ireland and the House of Commons of Southern Ireland would be used as the election for the Second Dáil. All those elected were on the roll of the Second Dáil, but as no Sinn Féin MP was elected for Belfast North, it was not represented there.

Politics

Belfast North was a predominantly Unionist area with considerable pockets of labour strength.  It returned four Unionists in 1921, but in 1925, it returned only two official Unionists, plus one independent Unionist and a Labour member.

Members of Parliament

Election results

References

Northern Ireland Parliament constituencies established in 1921
Northern Ireland Parliament constituencies disestablished in 1929
Constituencies of the Northern Ireland Parliament
Constituencies of the Northern Ireland Parliament in Belfast
Dáil constituencies in Northern Ireland (historic)